The sicklefin mullet (Neochelon falcipinnis) is a species of ray-finned fish, a grey mullet from the family Mugilidae which is found in the eastern Atlantic Ocean of the coasts of western Africa. It is the only species in the monospecific genus Neochelon.

References

Mugilidae
Taxa named by Achille Valenciennes 
Fish described in 1836